Mufulira is a constituency of the National Assembly of Zambia. It covers the southern part of Mufulira and a rural area to the south and east of the town in Mufulira District of Copperbelt Province.

The constituency was created in 1954 when the Mufulira–Chingola was split into two constituencies.

List of MPs

References

Constituencies of the National Assembly of Zambia
Constituencies established in 1954
1954 establishments in Northern Rhodesia